Mac OS Keyboard is an encoding used in Classic Mac OS to represent keyboard symbols.

Character set

References 

Keyboard